A zombie knife (also known as a zombie killer knife or zombie slayer knife) is a type of ornate knife or bladed weapon inspired by zombie films. These knives can range in size and shape but are commonly defined as having a cutting edge, a serrated edge and images or words (whether on the blade or handle) that suggest that it is to be used for the purpose of violence. Despite being designed for collectors and survivalists, the appearance of zombie knives led to their increasing usage in criminality. In 2018 parts of the United Kingdom made possession of such knives illegal.

History 
The first series of zombie themed knives were released in 2011 by American knife company KA-BAR after a company official joked about "the need of knives capable of killing a zombie when firearms aren't available". The original set of six knives named; Kharon, Acheron, Famine, War, Pestilence and Death featured distinct neon green handles and a bio-hazard symbol. Commenting on the company's Zombie Knife line CEO John Stitt stated that when exhibited at trade show SHOT 2011 "everybody laughed at us" however "the next year everything was green, everything was zombies!" Soon other manufactures such as Gerber joined the zombie craze by releasing their own zombie apocalypse inspired products.

Criminalization in the United Kingdom 
In 2015 after years of falling numbers, knife crime in London increased by 18% while the number of people murdered yearly increased by 26. Responding to the figures the Metropolitan Police outlined the sale of zombie knives on the dark web as one of the rises contributing factors.

A statutory instrument in English law has banned the importation, manufacture, sale or hire of weapons of this type, having a blade with:

 a cutting edge;
 a serrated edge; and 
 images or words (whether on the blade or handle) that suggest that it is to be used for the purpose of violence.

Sarah Newton, The Parliamentary Under-secretary of State for the Home Office, published a Statutory Instrument amending the Criminal Justice Act 1988, so as to prohibit the sale, importation and manufacture of these knives with effect from 18 August 2016. The prohibition was implemented by amending a statutory instrument made under the Criminal Justice Act 1988. The Offensive Weapons Act 2019 further prohibited possession of "zombie slayer knife[s]", even in private.

To bring Scots law in line with the equivalent law in England and Wales, the Scottish Parliament amended the relevant legislation, enacting The Criminal Justice Act 1988 (Offensive Weapons) (Amendment, Surrender and Compensation) (Scotland) Order 2022. This made possession of the knives illegal in Scotland, and established a three month period in which the knives could be surrendered to the police in exchange for compensation.

References 

Knives